Zagheh-ye Ali Karam (also Romanized as Zāgheh-ye ‘Alī Karam and Zāgheh ‘Alī Karam) is a village in Cheleh Rural District, in the Central District of Gilan-e Gharb County, Kermanshah Province, Iran. At the 2006 census, its population was 92, in 24 families.

References 

Populated places in Gilan-e Gharb County